Spinomantis peraccae is a species of frog in the mantellid subfamily Mantellinae. It is endemic to Madagascar and widely distributed in the northern, eastern, and central parts of the island. The specific epithet honours Italian herpetologist Mario Giacinto Peracca. Common name Peracca's Madagascar frog has been coined for it.

Taxonomy
George Albert Boulenger described this species in 1896 within the genus Rhacophorus. Rose M. A. Blommers-Schlösser transferred it to Mantidactylus in 1978.  placed it in the then-subgenus Blommersia in 1992, but it was moved to the then-subgenus Spinomantis by Glaw and Vences in 1994.

Description
Adult males measure  and adult females  in snout–vent length. The snout is rounded. The tympanum is distinct and supra-tympanic fold is prominent. The fingers have expanded discs but no webbing; the toes are webbed but the discs are smaller than those on the fingers. The dorsum is brownish-greenish and has darker blotches. Dorsal skin is rather warty with dark, protruding dots. The lower parts are whitish; there are few dark spots on the throat.

Geographic range
It is endemic to the eastern half of Madagascar.

Habitat
It is arboreal. The eggs are laid on leaves above water. The tadpole develop in slow-flowing streams.

Conservation status
Spinomantis peraccae is a locally abundant species, but it is suffering from habitat loss. It occurs in many protected areas. Because of its wide range and large overall population, it is not considered threatened.

References

peraccae
Endemic frogs of Madagascar
Amphibians described in 1896
Taxa named by George Albert Boulenger
Taxonomy articles created by Polbot